Katie is a town in Garvin County, Oklahoma, United States. It was incorporated in 2004 and had a population of 348 at the 2010 census. On May 9, 2016, an EF4 tornado touched down in the southern part of Katie, and tracked to the east, causing one death and several injuries.

Geography

Demographics

References

Towns in Oklahoma
Towns in Garvin County, Oklahoma